Honda Türkiye A.Ş. is a former car manufacturer based in Gebze, Turkey and a subsidiary of Honda.

History 
Since 1986, Honda vehicles have been distributed by Çelik Motor (a company of the Anadolu Group) in Turkey.

In 1992, joint venture "Anadolu Honda Otomobilcilik A.Ş." was founded, in which the Anadolu Group and Honda each held 50%. In 1996, the foundation was laid for a factory of its own, in which production began in late 1997 and early 1998. In 2002, Honda took over full control of company from the Anadolu Group. In the same year, the motorcycle production in Turkey was finished.

Between 2002 and 2006, annual production increased from around 5,400 to more than 18,000 vehicles. Honda announced that it will close its factory in Şekerpınar, Gebze which started production at the end of 1997, in a global decision in September 2021.

Models 
The first model produced from 1998 was the Civic. Production covers most of the EU market. In December 2005, production of the City started, but in 2016 it was discontinued.

References

External links 
 Website of Honda Türkiye

Car manufacturers of Turkey
Vehicle manufacturing companies established in 1992
Honda factories